The Korea Queer Film Festival (KQFF) is a film festival held annually in Seoul that showcases the lives of sexual minorities, which seeks to increase diversity in Korean films and the human rights of LGBTQ+ people and give insight into queer culture. KQFF was established in 2001 and has been held annually ever since. KQFF is the oldest gay and lesbian film festival in Korea, and is part of the Korea Queer Culture Festival. It aims to screen rare modern and older films on a wide range of LGBT topics. KQFF was originally named the "Rainbow Film Festival" (무지개영화제) for its 1st through 6th years, then changed its name to the "Seoul LGBT Film Festival" (서울LGBT영화제) for its 7th through 13th years, and since the 14th year has been referred to as the “Korean Queer Film Festival” (한국퀴어영화제). The festival aims to support and celebrate the LGBT community, to contribute to the development of LGBT films, to build a network among domestic and international filmmakers, establish cultural diversity and to be actively involved in cultural activism for LGBT rights.

History

2002: "A New Beginning: Coming Out Celluloid"  

The second annual Korea Queer Film Festival was held in 2002 from June 4 to 6 in “Gwanghwamun Il-Joo Arthouse - My Artcube” in Jongno-Gu in Seoul. The 2002 festival featured 18 films from 3 countries (Korea, USA, and Argentina).

2003: "Homosexual Lover, Homo, and Us"

The third annual Korean Queer Film Festival was held in the same location as in 2002: “Gwanghwamun Il-Joo Arthouse - My Artcube” in Jongno-Gu in Seoul. The 2003 festival featured 7 films from 4 countries (USA, Colombia, Australia, and Canada). No Korean films were shown this year. In addition, the films shown were all from previous years, ranging from the late 80s to late 90s. Films were shown in three categories: Dyke Drama, Their Story, and Hey, Victor.

Section A: Dyke Drama 

 "Ife" by H Len Keller (USA)
 "Things We Said Today" by John Miller-Monzon (USA)
 "Maya" by Caihanne Benedex (USA)
 "A Certain Grace" by Sandra Nettelbeck (USA)

Section B: Their Story 

 "Tampon Thief" by Jorge Lozano (Colombia)
 "Chrissy" by Jacqui North (Australia)

Section C: Hey, Victor 

 Salut Victor by Anne Claire Poirier (Canada)

2004: "A Shared Life" 
The fourth annual Korean Queer Film Festival was held June 25 to 29 in 2004, in “Gwanghwamun Il-Joo Arthouse - My Artcube” in Jongno-Gu in Seoul. The 2004 festival featured 13 films from 3 countries (Taiwan, Korea, and Japan).

Feature films 

 Goodbye, Dragon Inn by Tsai Ming-liang (Taiwan)
 Love Me, If You Can by Alice Wang (Taiwan)
 Desire by Kim Eun-Soo (Korea)
 Camellia Project-Three Queer Stories of Bogil Island by Choi Jin-sung, So Joon-moon, and Lee-Song Hee-il (Korea)

Short films 

 "때와 장소를 가리지 않는다" ("I do not choose when or where") by 카쥬 오쉬 (Japan)
 Boys Briefs by 사이먼 청  (Japan)
 "My Father's Song" by 이지선 (Korea)
 "Wonderful Day" by Kim Hyun-Pil (Korea)
 "A Crimson Mark" by Hyeon-jin Park (Korea)
 "Military Tango" by 황종원 (Korea)

2005: "Beyond the Rainbow Bridge"
The fifth annual Korea Queer Film Festival was held in 2005 from June 3 to 7 at the “Gwanghwamun Il-Joo Arthouse - My Artcube” in Jongno-Gu in Seoul. The 2005 festival featured 15 films from three countries (Korea, Japan, and USA).

2006: "Queer Happy Point" 
The sixth annual Korea Queer Film Festival was held in 2006 from June 6 to 11 at the “Seoul Art Cinema (Hollywood Theater)” (서울아트시네마 (허리우드극장)) in Jongno-Gu in Seoul. The 2006 festival featured 10 films from 5 countries (USA, Switzerland, Israel, Germany, and Thailand).

2007: "express you SeLFF" 
The seventh annual Korea Queer Film Festival was held in 2007 from June 6 to 10 at the “Seoul Art Cinema (Hollywood Theater)” (서울아트시네마 (허리우드극장)) in Jongno-Gu in Seoul. The 2007 festival featured 15 films from 7 countries (USA, UK, Korea, Japan, Germany, and Taiwan).

2008: "enjoy! your SeLFF" 
The eighth annual Korea Queer Film Festival was held in 2008 from June 4 to 8 at the “Seoul Art Cinema (Hollywood Theater)” (서울아트시네마 (허리우드극장)) in Jongno-Gu in Seoul. The 2008 festival featured 20 films from 9 countries (USA, Japan, Thailand, Canada, Korea, Australia, France, Brazil, and UK).

2009: "PRIDE YOUR SeLFF" 
The ninth annual Korea Queer Film Festival was held in 2009 from June 3 to 7 at the “Seoul Art Cinema (Hollywood Theater)” (서울아트시네마 (허리우드극장)) in Jongno-Gu in Seoul. The 2009 festival featured 29 films from 13 countries (USA, UK, Taiwan, Germany, Italy, France, Spain, Japan, Mexico, Israel, Thailand, Norway, and Australia).

2010: "L(Lively) G(Gay) B(Beautiful) T(Tasty) Going!" 
The tenth annual Korea Queer Film Festival was held in 2010 from June 4 to 8 at the “Seoul Art Cinema (Hollywood Theater)” (서울아트시네마 (허리우드극장)) in Jongno-Gu in Seoul. The 2010 festival featured 16 films from 6 countries (UK, USA, Argentina, Peru, France, and Korea).

2011: "너의 색을 밝혀라! Color of your SeLFF" 
The eleventh annual Korea Queer Film Festival was held in 2011 from June 2 to 8 at the “Seoul Art Cinema (Hollywood Theater)” (서울아트시네마 (허리우드극장)) in Jongno-Gu in Seoul. The 2011 festival featured 2 films from 2 countries (Korea and USA).

See also
 List of LGBT film festivals

References

2001 establishments in South Korea
Annual events in South Korea
Film festivals in Seoul
LGBT festivals in South Korea
LGBT film festivals
Film festivals established in 2001